Lee Duffy (born 24 July 1982) is an English former professional footballer who played as a defender for Rochdale in the Football League. His last contribution in football to date was player-manager at East of Scotland Football League club Inverkeithing Hillfield Swifts.

References

External links

1982 births
Living people
Footballers from Oldham
English footballers
Association football defenders
Rochdale A.F.C. players
Rossendale United F.C. players
Halifax Town A.F.C. players
Radcliffe F.C. players
Canvey Island F.C. players
Histon F.C. players
Glenrothes F.C. players
Bo'ness United F.C. players
Dundonald Bluebell F.C. players
English Football League players